Brussels Airlines is the flag carrier and largest airline of Belgium, based and headquartered at Brussels Airport. It operates to over 100 destinations in Europe, North America and Africa and also offers charter services, maintenance and crew training. It is a member of the Star Alliance as well as the International Air Transport Association. The airline's IATA code SN is inherited from its predecessors, Sabena and SN Brussels Airlines. Brussels Airlines is part of the Lufthansa Group.  The company slogan is ′You’re in good company′.

History

Early years (2005-2009)

Brussels Airlines was created following the merger of SN Brussels Airlines (SNBA) and Virgin Express, the former subsequently created after the bankruptcy of Belgium's previous national carrier Sabena. On 12 April 2005, SN Airholding, the company behind SNBA, signed an agreement with Richard Branson, giving it control over Virgin Express. On 31 March 2006 SNBA and Virgin Express announced their merger into a single company. On 7 November 2006, the new name, Brussels Airlines, was announced at a press conference at Brussels Airport. Brussels Airlines began operations on 25 March 2007. Sometime between this period, the airline was forced to change its 13-dot logo to a 14-dot logo due to superstitious passengers complaining about the logo.

On 15 September 2008, it was announced that Lufthansa would acquire a 45% stake in Brussels Airlines with an option to acquire the remaining 55% from 2011. As a part of this deal, Brussels Airlines would join Star Alliance. From 26 October 2008, the ICAO code was changed from DAT to BEL.

On 15 June 2009, Brussels Airlines announced that the European Commission had granted approval for Lufthansa to take a minority share in Brussels Airlines. As a result of this clearance by the EU, Brussels Airlines was able to join Star Alliance. Lufthansa purchased 45% of the company in 2009, and acquired the remainder in January 2017.

Since 25 October 2009, Brussels Airlines has been a member of Lufthansa's frequent flyer programme Miles & More. On 9 December 2009, Brussels Airlines became the 26th Star Alliance member during a ceremony at Brussels Town Hall. 

On 15 December 2009, Brussels Airlines announced it was working on a new regional airline in the Democratic Republic of the Congo. The name of the airline was Korongo. The main base of the airline was at Lubumbashi in Congo. The airline was launched in April 2012 and shut down in 2015. Brussels Airlines cancelled the airDC project, due to disagreements with Hewa Bora.

Development since 2010

On 5 July 2010, a fifth Airbus A330-300 entered into service. Brussels Airlines increased its frequency to Abidjan (up to 6 weekly) and added Accra, Cotonou, Ouagadougou, and Lomé as new destinations. On 11 August 2010, Brussels Airlines and tour operator Club Med announced new cooperation. As from April 2011, Brussels Airlines will transport 80% of all Club Med passengers out of Brussels, both on existing regular Brussels Airlines routes as on new charter routes operated by Brussels Airlines. Brussels Airlines also announced that it will lease 2 Airbus A320 aircraft from January 2011.

On 26 August 2010, the company announced its new maintenance project. The contract with Sabena Technics for the A330 and Boeing 737 ended on 1 January 2011 and Brussels Airlines will then do the maintenance on the planes. To be able to do this, the move from Building 117 to Hangar 41 was necessary. Also, 73 people from Sabena Technics joined the Brussels Airlines maintenance staff.

On 1 June 2012 Brussels Airlines inaugurated the route to New York JFK, operating daily with an Airbus A330-300 fitted with the new interior. This is the first Belgian airline in 10 years to fly to New York, after the collapse of Sabena and Delsey Airlines. Since 18 June 2013 they also fly 5 times a week to Washington Dulles. Since April 2016 Toronto Pearson has been added to the North-American network. It has been announced that as from March 2017 a new service to Mumbai will commence with 5 flights per week operated by a new Airbus A330-200 arriving early 2017.

On 30 January 2014, Brussels Airlines added 9 seasonal destinations and returned to the Polish market after some years of absence. It also confirmed the permanent exit of its Avro RJ100 fleet by 2016.

In April 2015, Brussels Airlines has been praised by the White House for continuing its normal flying operation to Western African countries during the Ebola outbreak, allowing essential aid to be delivered. All other airline companies, except Royal Air Maroc, suspended their flights to Sierra Leone, Liberia and Guinea.

On 22 March 2016, members of the terrorist organization ISIL detonated two bombs in Brussels Airport, closing the airport until Sunday, 27 March 2016. Brussels Airlines shifted some long haul flights to Zurich and Frankfurt and began Airbus A319/Avro RJ100 shuttle service between Liege/Antwerp and Zurich/Frankfurt, as well as providing contracted bus service from Brussels to Antwerp and Liege from where it served European destinations.

On 28 September 2016, the supervisory board of Lufthansa announced that the airline would exercise the option to acquire the remaining 55% of Brussels Airlines' parent company SN Airholding. The modalities would be defined before the end of the year to conclude the transaction at the beginning of 2017.

In March 2017, Thomas Cook announced its intention to sell its Belgian flight operations, Thomas Cook Airlines Belgium, which was shut down by November 2017 with two aircraft and all traffic rights being integrated into Brussels Airlines. Brussels Airlines took over the 160 Thomas Cook Airlines crew members.

In February 2018, CEO Bernard Gustin and financial director Jan De Raeymaeker resigned after a meeting with the Lufthansa board over the future of the airline. Gustin was replaced by Christina Foerster on 1 April 2018. On 1 May 2018, Dieter Vranckx joined the company as CFO.

In December 2019, it was announced that Dieter Vranckx will replace Christina Foerster as CEO of Brussels Airlines effective January 1, 2020.

During the COVID-19 pandemic in Belgium, Brussels Airlines suspended all flights from March 21 through April 19. Additionally, Brussels Airlines cancelled its wetlease contract with CityJet, leading to the termination of eight European destinations in the wake of the pandemic. At the end of June 2020, Brussels Airlines also announced that they were cancelling a number of flights scheduled for operation in September and October 2020. Like many airlines Brussels Airlines did not refund affected customers in line with Flight Compensation Regulation timelines during the COVID pandemic and encouraged passengers to take credit vouchers or flights on alternative dates instead. However, some passengers who found their flights cancelled by airline never got refunded and had to launch chargeback claims in order to get their money back.

In November 2021, Brussels Airlines announced a revision of their corporate design including a new logo.

Corporate affairs

Head office

The company is headquartered in the b.house (Building 26) in the General Aviation Zone on the grounds of Brussels Airport and in Diegem, Machelen, Flemish Brabant.

Ownership and structure
Brussels Airlines is the operating name of Brussels Airlines SA/NV (previously Delta Air Transport SA/NV) which has its registered office in Elsene-Ixelles, Brussels.

Brussels Airlines is almost 100% owned by SN Airholding SA/NV (1,811,308 shares out of 1,811,309), a Belgian holding company. Lufthansa owns 100% of SN Airholding SA/NV, having taken control of the remaining shares it did not own effective January 2017.

Dieter Vranckx has been the CEO since 1 January 2020. The executive committee consists of Dieter Vranckx (CEO & CCO) and Edi Wolfensberger (COO). Dieter Vranckx was previously the CFO of the company.

Business trends 
Limited information on Brussels Airlines appears to be published by the company or the Lufthansa Group. However, accounts for all Belgian companies must be filed with the National Bank of Belgium, and key trends over recent years are shown below (for years ending 31 December):

Destinations

Alliances
Brussels Airlines is a member of Star Alliance.

Codeshare agreements
Brussels Airlines codeshares with the following airlines:

 Aegean Airlines
 Aeroflot
 Africa World Airlines 
 airBaltic
 Air Canada
 Air Malta
 All Nippon Airways
 Asiana Airlines
 Austrian Airlines
 Cathay Pacific
 Croatia Airlines
 Egyptair
 Etihad Airways
 Eurowings
 Hainan Airlines
 Lufthansa
 Royal Air Maroc
 Singapore Airlines
 Swiss International Air Lines
 TAAG Angola Airlines
 TAP Air Portugal
 TAROM
 Thai Airways International
 United Airlines
In October 2019, Brussels Airlines and Africa World Airlines announced an interline agreement to better connect passengers traveling through their respective hubs in Accra and Brussels.

In December 2019, Brussels Airlines and Aeroflot announced a code-share agreement in effect January 20, 2020 between Moscow-Sheremetyevo and Brussels.

Fleet

Current fleet
, Brussels Airlines operates an all-Airbus fleet, composed of the following aircraft:

Fleet development
Brussels Airlines previously operated six British Aerospace 146s which were withdrawn in 2008.

During 2010, two Airbus A319-100s joined Brussels Airlines' fleet. The first Airbus A320-200 joined the fleet in February 2011 and made its first commercial flight on 23 April 2011. With improving financial performance, rising cash reserves and a desire to reduce costs more rapidly, Brussels Airlines accelerated its fleet replacement plan by ordering 12 aircraft in August 2011. Six A319s, four A320s and two A330-200s were added to the fleet. This has completed the exit of Boeing aircraft from the fleet and accelerated the replacement of the Avro RJ85.

Starting 2016, Brussels Airlines began phasing out its Avro RJ100s and replaced them with the Airbus A320 family and wet-leased Sukhoi Superjets. This was completed by the end of 2017. However, Brussels Airlines announced in July 2018 it would terminate the Superjet wet-lease contracts earlier than planned. This is due to the longer downtimes of the aircraft in case of repairs compared to more common and less new types. The Superjets have been phased out since January 2019.

In mid-2021, Brussels Airlines announced that it will take delivery of three Airbus A320neo aircraft in 2023 to replace ageing A319-100's and aim to lower  emissions amongst its fleet.

Special liveries
Brussels Airlines launched a series of Belgian Icon special liveries on its Airbus A320 fleet, all representing things that are typically Belgian, including Rackham (a Tintin themed aircraft), Magritte (an ode to the famous surrealist artist René Magritte), Trident (the aircraft for the Belgium national football team) and Amare (Tomorrowland Festival theme). On 24 March 2018 the airline introduced an additional aircraft themed to The Smurfs. In spring 2019 an additional aircraft was dedicated to the famous Flemish painter Bruegel.
The Magritte special livery was repainted in a Star Alliance livery in May 2021.

Services

Frequent-flyer programmes
Brussels Airlines uses Miles & More, Lufthansa's frequent flyer programme. Miles can be earned on flights operated by airlines which are part of the programme, in addition to flights operated by Star Alliance airlines.
Miles can also be earned with Brussels Airlines' non-airline partners.

On 19 October 2015, Brussels Airlines launched a new customer programme called LOOP, which is available for all flights in the airline's network. LOOP is designed for the increasing number of customers who fly Brussels Airlines regularly and do not receive significant benefits from traditional frequent flyer programmes. The LOOP programme was discontinued on February 1, 2020.

In-flight entertainment
Brussels Airlines offers two in-flight magazines. For the European network, there is b-there! which is a monthly magazine. On the African network, the magazine is named B Spirit Magazine, which is published every two months. The magazines are also available as a freely downloadable application for Apple iPad.

From November 2011 until the end of 2012 Brussels Airlines introduced a new interior on the A330 fleet. The new economy seats feature AVOD personal in-flight entertainment 9 inch screens. Additionally, business class has new lie-flat seats with an improved AVOD IFE system with 15 inch screens, supplied by the IMS-Company and known as "RAVE".

Tariff structure

On European flights 
The airline offers 5 different ticket types, and they are as follows:
 Economy Light is a low-cost fare, without checked-in luggage and with a buy on board program offering snacks and drinks for purchase.
 Economy Classic is a regular economy class with a buy on board program offering snacks and drinks for purchase.
 Economy Flex is an economy plus class with a buy on board program offering snacks and drinks for purchase, fast lane at security, change flexibility and priority boarding.
 Business Saver is a full-service business class on the European network. It offers premium meals, free champagne and some flexibility.
 Business Flex is identical to the Business Saver travel class, with additional flexibility, such as a fully refunable ticket, and the option to take an earlier flight on the same day of travel (depending on availability).

On medium-haul and long-haul flights (to Africa and North America) 
Brussels Airlines offers a variety of different fares depending on the travel class.

Economy class 

 Economy Light offering a standard economy seat with meals & beverages included, no check-in luggage allowance, and very little flexibility.
 Economy Basic offers the same amenities and flexibility options as Economy Light, but with one check-in bag weighing a maximum of 23kg included.
 Economy Basic Plus offers everything included in Economy Basic, but it is a refundable fare (with the exception of 190 EUR)
 Economy Flex is the same as Economy Basic Plus, but there is no cancellation fees, meaning a passenger can get a full refund. This is the most flexible economy ticket available. Selecting Economy Flex also allows the passenger to select their seat free of charge.

Premium economy 

 Premium Economy Basic offers free meals and beverages and two checked bags. It has very limited flexibility (rebooking costs €150 plus possible fare difference). Seat selection is not included in this fare.
 Premium Economy Basic Plus offers everything Premium Economy Basic offers, but with more flexibility options (rebooking without a fee, but a fare difference may apply. The ticket is refundable with the exception of €190).
 Premium Economy Flex is the most flexible economy plus fare class, as it is fully refundable. The rebooking option is the same as is offered in Premium Economy Basic Plus. Free seat selection is also included in this fare class.

Business Class 

 Business Flex is the full-service business class fare offered by Brussels Airlines on long-haul flights. It also offers full flexibility.

The fare offerings on medium and long-haul flights offered by Brussels Airlines may be different if a passenger has a connecting flights.

See also
List of airports in Belgium
Transport in Belgium

References

External links

Official website

Airlines of Belgium
Belgian brands
Association of European Airlines members
Airlines established in 2006
Star Alliance
Lufthansa Group
Machelen
Companies based in Flemish Brabant
Belgian companies established in 2006